Lou Bruce (c. 1935 – January 16, 1985) was a professional Canadian football end who played for the Ottawa Rough Riders for five seasons. He was drafted first overall in the 1956 CFL Draft by the Rough Riders. He was named an Eastern All-Star at the defensive end position for the 1960 season, the same year he won his first and only Grey Cup championship. He played football previously at Queen's University.

References

Queen's Golden Gaels football players
Ottawa Rough Riders players
1930s births 
1985 deaths
Year of birth uncertain